Disney+ is an over-the-top subscription video on-demand service owned and operated by Disney Entertainment, that first launched in the United States on November 12, 2019, eventually expanding to other territories. Its original series are created and produced by Disney-owned brands such as Disney Branded Television, 20th Century Studios, Pixar, Marvel Studios, Lucasfilm and National Geographic.

Original programming

Drama

Comedy

Animation

Unscripted

Docuseries

Reality

Variety

Shorts
These are shows where the majority of the episodes has a runtime of less than 20 minutes.

Continuations
These shows have been picked up by Disney+ for additional seasons after having aired previous seasons on another network.

Specials
These are supplementary content related to original TV series or films.

One-time

Episodic

Non-English language

Drama

Comedy

Unscripted

Co-productions
These titles have been commissioned in partnership with another network and are not listed as Disney+ Originals. Availability may vary across regions.

Specials

Regional original programming
These shows are originals because Disney+ commissioned or acquired them and had their premiere on the service, but they are only available in specific Disney+ territories.

Continuations

Specials

Exclusive international distribution 
These television shows are shows that have aired in different countries and Disney+ has exclusive distribution rights to stream them in another territory.

Upcoming original programming

Drama

Comedy

Animation

Adult animation

Kids & family

Unscripted

Docuseries

Reality

Shorts

Continuations

Specials
These are supplementary content related to original TV series or films.

One-time

Non-English language

Spanish

Other

Regional original programming
These shows are originals because Disney+ commissioned or acquired them and are scheduled to have their premiere on the service, but they will not be available in all Disney+ territories.

English language

Non-English language

Exclusive international distribution

In development

See also
List of Disney+ original films
List of Star original programming

Notes

References

External links

Disney-related lists
Lists of television series by streaming service